John Baker Manning (1833–1908) was Mayor of the City of Buffalo, New York, serving during January 1883 – 1884, in the aftermath of the resignation of Grover Cleveland. He was born July 13, 1833, in Albany, New York, and his siblings included Daniel Manning, who served as United States Secretary of the Treasury from 1885 to 1887. James Hilton Manning, who served as mayor of Albany, was his nephew.

As a child, Manning served as a page in the New York State Assembly and New York State Senate. He married Elizabeth House on January 14, 1856; after her death in 1894, in 1897 he married Marie Schrewnk.  In 1860–1862, he was the Albany correspondent for the Brooklyn Eagle.  Several years later, he moved to Buffalo and established his commission and malting businesses there.

Manning was elected mayor in a special election held on January 9, 1883, as the Democratic candidate.  He continued the string of vetoes begun by Mayor Grover Cleveland; they saved the city a great financial loss. Manning retired from politics after losing his campaign for re-election.

He continued to grow and expand the malting business and built several grain elevators in the 1890s, each with a large storage capacity. On May 30, 1902, the largest fire Black Rock had ever seen consumed Manning's Frontier Canada plant.  He died on April 28, 1908 at Brooklyn, New York and is buried in Forest Lawn Cemetery.

References

1833 births
1908 deaths
Mayors of Buffalo, New York
Burials at Forest Lawn Cemetery (Buffalo)